Zeng Shaoxuan (also spelled as Zeng Shao-Xuan, ;  ; born August 29, 1981, in Nanjing, Jiangsu) is a Chinese male tennis player. He competed for China at the 2008 Summer Olympics in the men's singles and men's doubles with partner Yu Xinyuan.

In the 2009, ATP Shanghai Masters 1000 (as a wildcard entrant), he made the second round. He defeated Israeli Dudi Sela 2–6, 6–1, 6–4 before losing to Jo-Wilfried Tsonga 3–6, 3–6.

See also
Tennis in China

External links
 
 

1981 births
Living people
Chinese male tennis players
Olympic tennis players of China
Sportspeople from Nanjing
Tennis players at the 2008 Summer Olympics
Tennis players at the 2002 Asian Games
Tennis players at the 2006 Asian Games
Tennis players from Jiangsu
Asian Games competitors for China